Roseway Waldorf School is a coeducational privately funded school in Alverstone, near Botha's Hill, KwaZulu-Natal, South Africa. It was founded in February 1985. The school now has programs from preschool through high school. The school is based on the principles of Waldorf education, laid down by the founder of Waldorf education, Rudolf Steiner.

The school is situated on a hilltop farm overlooking the Valley of a Thousand Hills and serves as the site of the Alverstone air monitoring station, one of 14 such sites in the Air Quality Monitoring Network in the South Durban Basin.

Academics
Roseway Waldorf School follows the Waldorf Steiner Curriculum.  

The Steiner Waldorf curriculum is holistic and spans the age range from 3–18 years. It places emphasis on integrating nature, art, crafts, drama and music into all academic learning including science & mathematics. It addresses all the multiple intelligences, including emotional literacy and kinesthetic learning.

In addition to developing analytical, logical and reasoning skills as education has always done, it focuses on the development of imagination, creativity, memory and flexible thinking skills.

The Steiner curriculum is based on understanding the development of a child and how children learn at different ages. It encourages the development of each child’s sense of truth, beauty, and goodness, and inspires in each child a lifelong love of learning. The Waldorf curriculum runs from preschool till the class 12 year (18 year old)

In their 13th year Roseway pupils write the National Senior Certificate Exam. This year, while inspired and strengthened by the Waldorf methodology, follows the D.O.E  CAPS curriculum. All work at this level is moderated and signed off by department officials. Learners choose seven of the 16 matriculation subjects offered at Roseway, namely:
 English Home Language
 Afrikaans FAL
 IsiZulu FAL
 Mathematics or Mathematical literacy
 Litcy, Life Orientation
 Physical Sciences
 Life Sciences
 Geography
 History
 Economics
 Consumer Studies
 Tourism
 Religion Studies
 Visual Arts
 Music
 Dramatic Art

References

External links
Roseway Waldorf School site
Waldorf Schools South Africa

Waldorf schools in South Africa
Private schools in KwaZulu-Natal
Educational institutions established in 1985
1985 establishments in South Africa